Marcel Ackermann (born 31 July 1974) is a Swiss sport shooter.

He participated at the 2018 ISSF World Shooting Championships, winning a silver medal.

References

External links

Living people
1974 births
Swiss male sport shooters
ISSF rifle shooters
People from Olten
Sportspeople from the canton of Solothurn